Cynthia D. Borrego is an American politician serving as a member of the New Mexico House of Representatives for the 17th district. Elected in November 2022, she assumed office on January 1, 2023.

Early life and education 
Borrego is a native of New Mexico. She earned a Bachelor of Science in education and Master of Public Administration from the University of New Mexico.

Career 
Outside of politics, Borrego operated a small business. She served as a member of the Albuquerque City Council from 2017 to 2021. She was also a member of the board of directors of the Albuquerque Metropolitan Arroyo Flood Control Authority and Rio Grande Credit Union. Borrego was elected to the New Mexico House of Representatives in November 2022.

References 

Living people
New Mexico Democrats
Women state legislators in New Mexico
Members of the New Mexico House of Representatives
Politicians from Albuquerque, New Mexico
University of New Mexico alumni
Year of birth missing (living people)